Oswald Parry (16 August 1908 – 1991) was a Welsh professional footballer. During his career he made over 100 appearances for Ipswich Town and 150 appearances (142 league matches) for Crystal Palace.

References

External links 
Ossie Parry at Pride of Anglia
Parry at holmesdale.net

1908 births
1991 deaths
Association football defenders
Welsh footballers
Crystal Palace F.C. players
Ipswich Town F.C. players
Wimbledon F.C. players
Chelmsford City F.C. wartime guest players